Head Detective Juliet Lynn "Jules" O'Hara is a character on the American comedy Psych  played by Maggie Lawson. She attended the University of Miami.

Fictional biography
Juliet O'Hara first appears undercover in the show's second episode, "Spellingg Bee", as a recently transferred junior detective from Miami Beach where she attended the University of Miami, replacing Lucinda Barry as Head Detective Carlton Lassiter's partner after Shawn discovered Carlton and Lucinda were having an affair during the first episode, "Pilot". Born in October 1981, she was raised in a family of brothers and is shown to be close with both her parents and her siblings.  Although she is initially frustrated by her coworkers not taking her seriously enough due to her relatively young age, as the series progresses she is given more responsibility, being left in charge in the absence of Lassiter and then Interim Chief Karen Vick.  She has grown more assertive with her partner, and actors Maggie Lawson and Timothy Omundson (who plays Lassiter) both suggest that a  strange mutual respect has developed between them.

Juliet seems to present a gentle counterpoint to Lassiter's gruff, rigid style.  She reminds her partner repeatedly to "be sensitive" with the media, the victims, and the witnesses of their cases.  Unlike Lassiter, she is friendly with Shawn Spencer and more willing to work with him and Burton Guster.  Lawson says that, although Juliet is bemused by Shawn at first, she has slowly gained respect for him and by the second season, Juliet reveals a "very friendly, comfortable relationship".  The actress says she thinks that, despite some skepticism, Juliet does believe that Shawn is psychic.  By the end of the fifth season, Shawn and Juliet are romantically involved. By the middle of the sixth season, Shawn is ready for marriage.
Her older brother Ewan, played by John Cena, is an army soldier whom she had to arrest when he attempted to murder an actual killer to protect the army. Ewan was supposed to go to prison but his high level bosses made him vanish.  Juliet claims Ewan was the reason she became a cop, that him joining the military gave her enough confidence to join the police force. Her estranged con artist father Frank O'Hara is played by William Shatner.
She seems to be Scots Irish, with her family hailing from Inverness.

Relationship with Shawn Spencer
Season 1
 "Spellingg Bee" (1.02) - Shawn and Juliet meet for the first time when Juliet unknowingly steals his seat in a diner. Shawn attempts to flirt with her, but Juliet's reception is cool. Shawn eventually figures out that Juliet is a cop and that she is staking out the diner.
 "Speak Now or Forever Hold Your Piece" (1.03) - When Shawn "reads" Juliet's palm, the two have a moment of mutual understanding. They agree to help each other out on the case, thus beginning their camaraderie.
 "Weekend Warriors" (1.06) - Shawn called Juliet "Jules" for the first time, when they are both watching a Civil War reenactment.
 "Shawn vs. the Red Phantom" (1.08) - At the beginning of the episode, Shawn calls Juliet apparently from somewhere he can see her. She asks Shawn where he is, and he responds by asking if she really wants to know the answer. She says, "I don't ask questions I don't want to know the answer to." Shawn then advises her not to ask "your boyfriend if he thinks your sister's hot." She informs him she does not have a sister, to which he asks, "How about a boyfriend?" Shawn then takes on a missing-person's case as a "favor" to Juliet, informing Gus that he hopes for bigger favors in the future, ones that he cannot share "with nuns and men of the cloth."
 "From the Earth to the Starbucks" (1.10) - Shawn and Juliet team up to solve a case for Lassiter. Juliet admits that Shawn does makes her laugh... occasionally.
 "He Loves Me, He Loves Me Not, He Loves Me, Oops He's Dead" (1.11) - When Shawn and Juliet go under cover at a speed-dating event, the hostess informs them that their personality questionnaires were a 100% compatibility match, "a speed-dating first." Shawn later claims to have copied hers verbatim. Shawn is also clearly jealous when he runs into Juliet on a date at the bowling alley. 
Season 2
 "Meat Is Murder, But Murder Is Also Murder" (2.06) - Shawn goes under cover as a horoscope writer at the newspaper where the victim worked. He directs his horoscopes at specific people, such as Detective Lassiter and his dad. In the one meant for Juliet, he writes, "Your one true love will be wearing sneakers and an Apple Jacks T-shirt." Shawn then wears sneakers and an Apple Jacks T-shirt, and Jules seems to get the message, though she does not say anything. After solving the case, Juliet says to Shawn, "Looks like you're finally able to communicate your visions again." and Shawn says, "Im having another vision right now, you and me celebrating over dinner and drinks." Juliet replies, "Hmm. Sounds like you're still a little off."  Shawn took her rejection pretty well.
 "Rob-a-Bye Baby" (2.08) - While investigating a nanny agency, Shawn and Juliet go under cover as a married couple.
 "Bounty Hunters!" (2.09) - When Juliet makes a mistake that results in a suspected murderer escaping custody, Shawn saves the day by reapprehending the prisoner. When Juliet thanks Shawn, he assures her that it was a mistake and "that's what friends are for." Shawn leans in to kiss Juliet, but she refuses to kiss him, saying it would be "a mistake." Shawn pulls away, respecting her wishes, but nevertheless walks away smiling. Once alone, Juliet disassembles and reassembles her gun, a stress-relieving exercise she learned in the police academy.
 "Gus' Dad May Have Killed an Old Guy" (2.10) - Shawn and Gus are going around the station giving everyone Christmas presents, but after giving Juliet hers, Shawn states that it is just from him.
Season 3
 "Murder? ... Anyone? ... Anyone? ... Bueller?" (3.02) - While talking to his high-school crush Abigail Lytar at their reunion, Shawn spots Juliet across the gymnasium and murmurs, "Pretty much perfect."
 "The Greatest Adventure in the History of Basic Cable" (3.04) - When Shawn will not stop cracking jokes in the interrogation room, Juliet leans across the table and demands that he share what he knows, to which Shawn marvels, "My God that was so hot." When Shawn leaves the room with the supposed men of the Spanish government, he hands Jules a paper, telling her the truth about the "Spanish". He also wrote, "You smell nice" on the paper. Later, after Juliet leads the SBPD to Shawn and Gus' rescue, Shawn and Juliet share a meaningful glance.
 "Talk Derby to Me" (3.07) - Shawn sets up a romantic dinner for Juliet and himself, complete with music, candles, and flowers. She cannot stay, however, because she has to follow a lead. When that lead turns out to be a red herring, Shawn takes the blame for the mistake. After the case is closed, Shawn and Juliet go on a couples skate-alone at the roller rink and brush hands several times; as the camera zooms out, their hands pressed together, though they are not actually holding hands.
 "Gus Walks into a Bank" (3.08) - Shawn and Juliet have a minor squabble about her decision to date Cameron Luntz, the head of SWAT. Shawn eventually tells her it is okay, he just wants her to be happy. When Juliet's date with Luntz for that evening is cancelled, she finds Shawn at the Psych office. The two take a stroll on the boardwalk eating hot dogs.
 "Christmas Joy" (3.09) - Shawn, while discussing an old flame with Juliet, says, "Don't worry, it was long before I knew you." Juliet insists that it is irrelevant, meaning that from her point of view, no relationship exists between them. Shawn, however, does not seem convinced.
 "Six Feet Under the Sea" (3.10) - Juliet befriends a woman named April, who expresses an interest in Shawn and asks for Juliet's opinion of him. Juliet's reaction implies that she has feelings for Shawn. Later, Shawn asks April out, but she turns him down because she does not want to "get in the way." She wishes Shawn good luck, leaving him confused.
 "Lassie Did a Bad, Bad Thing" (3.11) - Officer Drimmer asks Shawn if Juliet and he are an item. He then proceeds to tell Shawn that Juliet talks about him a lot, calling him "witty and urbane."
 "Any Given Friday Night at 10PM, 9PM Central" (3.13) - Juliet is checking out one of the football players as he runs out onto the field. When he turns around, Juliet is astonished to discover that he is Shawn! Later, Juliet smiles widely as she watches Shawn leading a football team out onto the field, but quickly hides it when Gus notices.
 "Tuesday the 17th" (3.15) - When Shawn is introducing Juliet, he calls her "one of Santa Barbara's finest, both literally and figuratively", and Juliet is flattered rather than annoyed. Also, after Juliet saves Shawn's life by shooting his assailant in the hand, Shawn tells her, "That level of markmanship is easily one of the sexiest things that I've ever-" Juliet cuts him off, but smiles softly nonetheless.
 "An Evening with Mr. Yang" (3.16) - Juliet finally asks out Shawn on a date, and owns up to the fact that she has been sending mixed signals. Unfortunately, Shawn tells her the timing is awful, as he is on a date with his old high-school flame, Abigail. When Shawn explains the situation, Juliet understands. She kisses him on the cheek and leaves. Shawn is obviously affected by the kiss, but rejoins Abigail.
Season 4
 "Extradition: British Columbia" (4.01) - Shawn does not know how to act around Juliet, now that he is dating Abigail. He tells Juliet, "I refuse to feel uncomfortable around you. It's silly. You mean too much to me, and I am perfectly capable of keeping this [their friendship] platonic, as long as you are." Juliet replies, "I am too! Great!" As she walks away, Shawn questions, "But how?" They also take what feels like a romantic stroll, as pointed out by Juliet, on a suspension bridge overlooking a river.
 "High Noon-ish" (4.03) - Shawn tips his cowboy hat at Juliet and winks at her. Juliet smiles, but quickly looks down as if embarrassed.
 "Bollywood Homicide" (4.06) - When Shawn asks if Juliet believes in love curses, she says whenever someone is looking for their soulmate, it can feel like outsides forces are conspiring against them. Shawn moves closer to Juliet, and she leans back, probably thinking that Shawn is going to kiss her. She asks, "Shawn, what are you doing?" Shawn does not answer the question, instead pointing out a clue that he had seen while they were moving toward each other. When Raj and Juliet go on their pretend date, Shawn, watching from a car, is clearly jealous when Raj starts to hold Juliet's hand, as noted by Gus and Lassiter. Later, Shawn rescues Juliet from an unstable suspect threatening her with a knife. Abigail tells Shawn that she was very impressed that he would risk his life for a random coworker. Shawn glances over at Juliet and says, "She's not random." So Abigail would not get the wrong impression, Shawn quickly corrects himself, saying he would do that for anyone.
 "Shawn Takes a Shot in the Dark" (4.09) - After Shawn's kidnapping, Juliet goes to his apartment with Gus to search for clues.  When she sees Abigail's toothbrush and some items, she becomes very curious if Abigail moved in.  Gus replies that they have reached the "he has a drawer, she has a toothbrush" stage to which Juliet seems affected.  Shawn, who has been shot and kidnapped, tells one of his kidnappers that he has a girlfriend named Abigail and that he wants to call her to say goodbye before they kill him. Shawn then calls Juliet and proceeds to give her clues about his whereabouts. The kidnapper tells Shawn to tell "Abigail" that he loves her. Shawn does. Juliet, believing the profession of love to be real, responds by saying, "Shawn, I think I..." Shawn interrupts her by saying, "Goodbye, Abigail." He hangs up. Juliet is clearly confused, but is able to use his clues to track down his whereabouts, and he is saved. After the ordeal, Shawn discusses with Gus the possibility that Juliet was going to say, "I love you" back. Although Gus states the possibility that she was just doing what she had to do, Shawn does not seem convinced.
 "You Can't Handle This Episode" (4.10) - Juliet's brother, Ewan O'Hara, reveals that Juliet has said a lot of good things about Shawn. Later, Ewan says explicitly that Juliet "likes [Shawn] a lot", and he puts his stamp of approval on Shawn, as well. Meanwhile, Abigail leaves for Uganda.
 "A Very Juliet Episode" (4.12) - Juliet receives news that her college boyfriend Scott might be dead. After receiving the awful news,  Shawn and she  take a long walk together through the park, during which Shawn gives Juliet a friendly hug. Shawn then searches high and low for Scott, who turns out to be in witness protection. Once the couple is reunited, Shawn is clearly jealous. Shawn bargains with the criminal Scott put in jail to not have Scott harmed if Shawn will prove the criminal's innocence. Shawn holds up his end of the bargain, and though Scott was no longer in danger, Juliet and he parted ways, agreeing to meet again in a year.
 "Death Is in the Air" (4.13) - At the beginning of the episode, Shawn and Gus are talking about all the things Shawn can do since he is single and does not need to impress anyone, but then Juliet walks up and he immediately throws away his stinky snack- obviously he wants to impress Juliet. More importantly, Juliet gets exposed to the Thornburg virus and Shawn rushes to find the antidote. Upon returning, Shawn explains to Gus that the threat of Juliet's mortality made him realize he does not have as much time as he thought; he has to tell her how he feels. Gus informs them both that Juliet has not contracted the virus after all, but Shawn tries to go through with his admission, anyway. He ultimately stumbles and fails to tell Juliet how he feels, which is immediately followed by Lassiter's entry into the room, effectively killing the moment.
 "Mr. Yin Presents" (4.16) - A serial killer named Mr. Yin kidnaps both Juliet and Abigail, who just returned from Uganda. Yin forces Shawn to choose one of them to save, but only has Juliet read him the clue to save her life. Juliet tries to tell Shawn he can save Abigail, but Yin cuts her off. Shawn gets the clue to save Abigail from Yang's book, and sends Gus with Lassie to save Juliet, saying the only way he would be able to not be there for Jules is if he knows that Gus is. Lassiter and Gus arrive and they are able to save Juliet in time, while Shawn is able to save Abigail. At the end, Juliet breaks down sobbing as Lassiter hugs her. Abigail tells Shawn she cannot handle the danger and breaks up with him.
Season 5
 "Romeo and Juliet and Juliet" (5.01) - Juliet was temporarily reassigned to City Hall sometime shortly after her ordeal with Mr. Yin to deal with the stress from it. Shawn seeks her help on a case from which his father has barred him, involving a kidnapping within two rival Chinese gangs. Juliet gives him information, but does not return to the SBPD. Shawn calls her for back up before confronting kidnapper, Teno Tan. He is easily outmatched, but Teno surrenders when Juliet arrives before Shawn is killed. They thank each other and agree to hug, but Lassiter interrupts. Shawn calls for a rain check.
 "Feet Don't Kill Me Now" (5.02) - Henry allows Shawn and Juliet to team up after Lassiter chooses Gus to help on the case. Their partnership does not hold up, as Shawn realizes he works best with Gus, as does Juliet with Lassiter. Shawn and Juliet attend a tap recital together to support their respective partners.
 "Shawn 2.0" (5.08) - Shawn plans to invite Juliet to a friend's wedding, but "criminal profiler" Declan Rand beats him to the punch. Juliet offers to reschedule, but Shawn plays it off not wanting her to be forced. Shawn becomes increasingly jealous of Declan, whom Gus dubs "Shawn 2.0" because of their similarities. Like Shawn, Declan is a fraud who acquired his profiling expertise from his father. Both threaten to expose each other if either one of them does not come clean himself. Like he has the entire episode, Declan beats Shawn, making his confession to Juliet first. She forgives Declan and they go for coffee, leaving Shawn unable to say anything.
 "One, Maybe Two, Ways Out" (5.09) - Juliet is now in a serious relationship with Declan, of which Shawn is very jealous. Declan is even planning a vacation for Juliet and himself. After Shawn and Gus cause Nadia's capture, Juliet overhears Shawn telling Gus that he cannot be happy without her, though he knows he should be glad that she is happily in a relationship. Juliet is visibly affected by his words. After Nadia is freed and Fong is taken into custody, Shawn and Gus again arrive at Declan's residence. Declan tells them to make their visit quick, as he is bidding 30 million euros on an item over the phone. Gus, intrigued by this, follows Declan upstairs. Shawn is left alone in the foyer, at which point Juliet enters the room, surprised to see him. She questions Shawn about how he solved such an intricate case and why there might be three creme brulé dishes at Declan's computer, but he does not rat out Declan for helping. Shawn wishes her a great four days off, but she corrects that it is two weeks, visibly upsetting him. He makes Juliet promise to enjoy her vacation, and tells her to take many mental photographs. As Shawn starts going off on a tangent, Juliet abruptly kisses him. She then pulls back, and both  Shawn and she are left speechless from the kiss. Declan and Gus return, and Shawn, too stunned to make any witty remarks, simply wishes them a good vacation. Declan goes to pack as Shawn and Gus leave, and Shawn takes one more look at Juliet before he closes the door. Juliet is left standing in the foyer, alone.
 "Extradition II: The Actual Extradition Part" (5.10) - Shawn and Gus are invited to visit Despereaux in Canada. Before Shawn leaves, his father advises him to speak with Juliet, as he overheard Shawn talk about her via butt dialing. Shawn asks after her at the station, but Buzz tells him she already has her passport. Juliet and Lassiter arrive to take Despereaux to the United States, to Shawn's visible shock, and he asks Juliet to talk. Later, Juliet comes to his hotel room and tells him that she had broken up with Declan, but Shawn cannot talk with her as Gus and Despereaux are inside, resulting in Jules walking away upset. At the end of the episode, Shawn asks Lassiter where Juliet is, with the answer "Grabbin' a muffin". He finds her at a platform overlooking the ocean, but she is still upset, claiming they missed their moment. Shawn does not give up and explains to Juliet that since they met, he has thought about replacing his motorcycle, a beloved symbol of freedom, with a car. They kiss passionately, but are disrupted by the tourists at the overlook. Then, they move to a gift shop, where they are interrupted by a customer who calls Juliet a "slut". They then go to a car, and are once more interrupted by a cop. Shawn realizes that he has a room before the camera pans to the sky. 
 "In Plain Fright" (5.11) - At the beginning of the episode, Shawn and Juliet are revealed to be officially a couple.
 "Dual Spires" (5.12) Shawn and Gus are standing near the lake where their murder victim was found, and where the only cell service zone in the town is. When Juliet shows up unexpectedly. Shawn distracts Gus by saying, "Dude, labradoodle!", and Juliet and Shawn share a quick kiss.
 "Yang 3 in 2D" (5.16) - Juliet seems uneasy as Shawn (now her boyfriend) sides with a supposed Yin kidnap victim. When Shawn and Gus are trapped inside Yin's house, she is the first to get Yang out of confinement, and when Yang tries to make a deal with the police, Jules agrees.  Yang gets to take an updated picture with Shawn, and Juliet is the only person to accompany her into the house. Juliet does not hesitate to agree to the conditions and the two enter the house. Shawn is saved, and after Yang gets her picture, she says to Shawn, "Catch up with you later, Mr. Spencer." After finishing his statement on the Yin case, Shawn goes looking for Jules, and finds her in the interrogation room. She says she cannot finish her statement because it is like "marking the time 'til the next crazy rolls in." To that, Shawn replies that he is there for her and will "always protect her", and she responds the same and Shawn kisses her hand. He then tells her he will see her that night later on and kisses her on the lips. The camera pans to reveal that Lassiter has seen and heard their entire conversation and now knows about their secret romantic relationship.
Season 6
 "Shawn Rescues Darth Vader" (6.01) - Lassiter hooks Juliet to a lie detector and tries to trick her into admitting she is in a relationship with Shawn. She later confesses to Lassiter outright that she is dating Shawn, but he feels their trust has been broken. Lassiter puts Shawn in the same lie detector when the latter seemingly was at the crime scene. Shawn declares this has to do with  Juliet and his romantic involvement, and he blurts out that he loves her, shocking everyone in the room and himself. He also admits while under the lie detector that he is a psychic, which further deepens Juliet's trust in Shawn. Later, Lassiter hooks himself up to the lie detector in Shawn's presence and then warns Shawn if he hurts Juliet, Lassiter will discharge his weapon...repeatedly. The lie detector plainly shows that he isn't lying.
 "Last Night Gus" (6.02) - Due to some drugged drinks, Shawn forgets a conversation he had with Juliet when she tells him they need to talk about it, and saying it was serious causing him to freak out. She reveals that he had asked her to move in and is surprised he does not remember. They agree that it is probably too soon.
 "The Amazing Psych-Man and Tap Man, Issue #2" (6.04) - Shawn quickly becomes jealous as Juliet shows admiration for the Mantis, a vigilante who is competing with the SBPD to catch the Camino drug syndicate. When they are on a date, Shawn realizes that Juliet got a text from the SBPD that requires her to leave. Though reluctant, she departs.
 "Shawn, Interrupted" (6.06) - Juliet shows concern for Shawn when he goes under cover at a mental institution, admitting that her deepest fear was that Shawn would not be able to come out, after Shawn makes an off-hand comment about enjoying it there, "Spoiler. I'm making you a wallet." Shawn reassures her, but Juliet is still not at ease.
 "In for a Penny..." (6.07) - Shawn invites Juliet's estranged con-artist dad, Frank, to her birthday party, then hires him to assist on a case. Juliet is furious with Shawn and has no intention of reconciling with her father. She changes her mind when Frank tells her he attended all her recitals and talent shows. At her birthday party, Juliet has made peace with her dad and forgiven Shawn, since his heart was in the right place.
 "Neil Simon's Lover's Retreat" (6.09) - Shawn and Juliet go away on a romantic vacation, but they are robbed by their new 'friends', who call themselves "Barbie and Clive", possibly taken from the 1930s criminals, Bonnie and Clyde. While tracking down the thieves, they come across a murder, effectively spoiling their plans. Shawn apologizes, since Juliet had "definite expectations" for their vacation, including the "M word", causing Juliet to explain that she had not been expecting a marriage proposal, since it is too soon and  she was in no way ready to get married. Shawn agrees seemingly relieved. The clerk returns Shawn's stolen Nintendo DS, which Shawn had been having a fit about throughout the episode when discovering it had been stolen, much to Juliet's annoyance and confusion.  Gus hears a rattle from inside it; he opens the battery case and finds an engagement ring, revealing that Shawn had actually planned to propose to Juliet during their vacation.
 "Indiana Shawn and the Temple of the Kinda Crappy, Rusty Old Dagger" (6.10) - The episode opens up to Gus confronting Shawn over the ring he found, and Gus is clearly upset because Shawn was going to propose to Juliet, and never told Gus about it. Shawn apologizes, telling Gus that he "had to be ready for a Shamu moment." Shawn promises that when he pops the question to Juliet, Gus will be there, and offers a fist bump, which Gus ignores, saying, "That's storybook right there." 
 "Heeeeere's Lassie" (6.11) - Shawn keeps looking for a spot to stash the ring, since he is not ready to give it to Juliet. Gus suggests putting it back in Henry's drawer if he is not going to propose. Juliet's dad Frank arrives from Tanzania, stating he got Shawn's voicemail saying he had something important to discuss. Shawn left the voicemail when he was considering proposing and wanted to ask Frank for his blessing. He asks for permission to marry Juliet in case he needs it in the future. Frank explains to Shawn he wants his daughter to marry someone honest and asks if Shawn has ever lied to Juliet, which Shawn hesitates before answering. Gus answers in the affirmative and Frank leaves without offering or denying his blessing, leaving Shawn confused about whether or not he had Juliet's father's blessing to one day propose to Juliet.
 "Shawn and the Real Girl" (6.12) - Juliet proves to be jealous as Shawn infiltrates into a reality show in which several men vie for the heart of a woman. Later, Shawn admits to considering himself lucky to have her in his life.
 "Santabarbaratown" (6.16) - At the end, Juliet and Shawn are walking by the station, talking about Shawn moving in with her.
Season 7
 "Juliet Takes a Luvvah" (7.02) - Juliet and Shawn decide to live together.
 "No Country for Two Old Men" (7.04) - After a homewarming party for Juliet and Shawn, her stepfather Lloyd runs into trouble with Mexican gangsters over his gambling debts.
 "Deez Nups" (7.07) - During Lassiter's wedding reception, Juliet confronts Shawn about inconsistencies that she found in his latest "vision", leading her to deduce that he is a mentalist, not a psychic, which Shawn confirms. Heartbroken, Juliet splashes her drink in Shawn's face, tearfully exiting the scene.
 "Right Turn or Left for Dead" (7.08) - Juliet tells Shawn to move out in an innovative episode that weaves together two possible timelines.
 "Juliet Wears the Pantsuit" (7.09) - Shawn moves out, reluctantly. At the end of the episode, he helps Juliet repair a window and they are seen to still have chemistry. However, Juliet is not ready to forgive him for lying.
 "Santa Barbarian Candidate" (7.10) - Juliet attends the Founders Gala as Shawn's date. As they dance, Juliet learns that Shawn went back to take dancing lessons that he had previously lied about going to when he learned what it meant to her. Juliet asks where "this Shawn" was when they were dating, to which he says that he's "right here". After dancing with him, she admits to Shawn that she still has feelings for him, but tells him that he has to tell Chief Vick about his lie about being a psychic. He refuses to, as he would not be able to do good or help people's lives like he always has. Juliet tells him that what he does is not good for everyone. At the end of the episode, Shawn decides to confess his lie to Chief Vick for the sake of smoothing things back over with Juliet. He almost tells Chief Vick that he is not a psychic, but Juliet comes in claiming that Shawn led her to Mike's house to get the photos. She tells Shawn later on that she could not be selfish and have him reveal his lie. She seems to be slowly beginning to trust him again. Shawn makes an attempt to kiss her, but she says that she is not ready to get back together yet. Despite telling him this, the two agree to go out to eat together. 
 "Office Space" (7.11) - After going out to eat together from the previous episode, Juliet and Shawn are shown asleep next to each other in bed at her place. While sleeping, he wakes up to Gus tapping on the window, and leaves to help him. Later, at the station,  Shawn and she are talking, and he remarks, "[they are] back in the saddle". However, Juliet says that nothing is back yet, what they did was a "one-time thing", and since they were adults, "it happens".
 "Nip and Suck It" (7.13) - At the end of the episode, Shawn tells Gus that Juliet and he are officially back together. Shawn remarks that Juliet made him "work" for it, but that they are finally together again. 
 "No Trout About It" (7.14) - Shawn and Juliet make a romantically goofy phone call as revealed by Shawn when retelling a case to a police consultant, much to Juliet's embarrassment. She later voices her concerns about her position at the department due to intraoffice dating with Shawn, which is usually against police regulations.
Season 8
 "The Break Up" (8.10) - Shawn and Juliet get engaged to be married outside a crime scene in San Francisco, only to have the engagement ring get stolen by a mugger.
Psych: The Movie
 Shawn and Juliet finally marry after the engagement ring is retrieved.

References

Fictional Santa Barbara Police Department detectives
Psych characters
Television characters introduced in 2006